The 1961–62 season was Sport Lisboa e Benfica's 58th season in existence and the club's 28th consecutive season in the top flight of Portuguese football, covering the period from 1 August 1961 to 31 July 1962. Benfica competed domestically in the Primeira Divisão and Taça de Portugal, and participated in the European Cup after winning the competition in the previous season. As the reigning European Cup holders, they represented the continent in the Intercontinental Cup.

In the third year of Béla Guttmann's stint, Benfica had a slow transfer market, only noted addition was 
António Simões. The season did not start in the best of ways, with the team losing the Intercontinental Cup and suffering a blip in performance that saw him trail leaders by five points before December. However, the performance in Europe remained unchanged and Benfica progressed to the quarter-finals after beating Austria Wien. The domestic performance remained disappointing in January and February, while in Europe, Benfica lost 3–1 to Nürnberg. A strong second leg put them in the semi-finals, where they met Tottenham Hotspur. A 3–1 win in Lisbon was followed by a 2–1 loss in London, meaning had qualified for their second consecutive European Cup Final. They would face Real Madrid on 2 May 1962. In an entertaining game, Benfica trailed twice, but managed to overcame Madrid in the second half for 5–3 win, retaining the European Cup. They concluded the season with their 11th Taça de Portugal win.

Season summary
After a highly successful season, where Benfica won their first European Cup and added the league title, Béla Guttmann remained for a third year, with an increased salary. The club released several players but only signed one; instead they promoted António Simões from the youth team. The pre-season began on 25 August and their first game was on the 28th. They met Atlético CP and Sporting CP in Taça Angola: two short matches in the same day in festival to celebrate Angola. They faced the same teams in the Taça de Honra, finishing runners-up to Sporting. Official competition began on 4 September with the first leg of the Intercontinental Cup with Peñarol. A one-nil win in Lisbon followed a 5–0 loss in Montevideo. In the replay, Penãrol won 2–1 and took the Intercontinental Cup.

Domestically, Benfica started their title defence with two wins, but four winless matches, which included a loss in Coimbra, caused Benfica to fell to sixth place, three points shy of leaders Sporting. However, in the European Cup, Benfica had no problem beating Austria Wien in the first round. In December, the gap to Sporting increased to five points after a 2–1 defeat in the Clássico. The same month, Eusébio had the first of several left knee operations. In the opening month of 1962, Benfica drew to Sporting in the Derby de Lisboa; a result that best served Sporting's interest, who kept a four-point lead. In February, Eusébio returned to action on the 12th, while his teammates were defeated in the snow of Nuremberg, on the first leg of the quarter-finals. Nürnberg won 3–1 with the help of Costa Pereira, who had a poor performance. Before the second leg of the European tie, Benfica lost to Sporting da Covilhã, complicating their hopes of renewing the league title. They recovered from their domestic disarray and thrashed Nürnberg by 6–0, qualifying for the semi-finals.

The following month, Benfica lost more points in the league, with Belenenses, practically ending any chance of retaining the Primeira Divisão badge. Nonetheless, in Europe, the situation was much better, with the team beating Tottenham Hotspur by 3–1 in Lisbon, which gave them a precious advantage to London. On the 5 April, Benfica lost 2–1 on the White Hart Lane, home of Tottenham, but they still qualified for their second consecutive European Cup Final on a 4–3 aggregate win. Later in the month, they defeated Porto in the third round of the Portuguese Cup. 

On 2 May, Benfica met Real Madrid in Amsterdam. The Spaniards were the overwhelming favourites, with players such as Alfredo Di Stéfano, Ferenc Puskás and Francisco Gento. Madrid started better and, by the 23rd minute, Puskás had scored a double. Águas brought it down to 2–1 on the 25th minute after he deflected a powerful shot from Eusébio. Less than 10 minutes later, Eusébio again cushioned a cross to Cavém who fired into the net. Madrid reacted with another goal from Puskás putting the score at 2–3 at half-time. Five minutes into the second half, Coluna levelled the game again with a strong shot from outside the lines. On the 64th minute, Eusébio was brought down by Pachín inside the box, with the referee signalling a penalty that Eusébio himself converted. Five minutes later, in a free-kick after a mistake by José Santamaría, Coluna served Eusébio, who blasted another goal, the 5–3. Benfica had successfully retained the European Cup. May closed with another Derby de Lisboa, with Benfica losing and handing over the title to Sporting. In early June, Benfica embarked on a tour through the Mediterranean and closed the season with the semi-finals and final of the Taça de Portugal. On 1 July 1962, Benfica won their 11th Portuguese Cup, with a double from Eusébio and another from Cavém. Guttmann meanwhile, despite winning eight times the amount of money his players received, resigned, saying "the third year is almost deadly for a manager", adding his famous curse.

Competitions

Overall record

Primeira Divisão

League table

Results by round

Matches

Taça de Portugal

First round

Second round

Third round

Quarter-final

Semi-final

Final

European Cup

First round

Quarter-final

Semi-final

Final

Intercontinental Cup

Friendlies

Player statistics
The squad for the season consisted of the players listed in the tables below, as well as staff member Béla Guttman (manager),  Fernando Cabrita (assistant manager).

|}

Transfers

In

Out

Notes

References

Bibliography
 
 
 
 

S.L. Benfica seasons
Benfica
UEFA Champions League-winning seasons